Manu Majumdar is an Awami League politician and the incumbent Member of Parliament of Netrokona-1.

Early life 
Majumdar was born on 14 August 1959.

Career
Majumdar hailing from Kishoreganj, Dhaka was elected to parliament from Netrokona-1 as an Awami League candidate 30 December 2018 and later became a voter of Netrokona afterwards. He had received 249,738 votes while his nearest rival, Kaiser Kamal of Bangladesh Nationalist Party, received 16,332 votes. He is the brother-in-law of the previous member of parliament, Chhabi Bishwas, from Netrokona-1. His nominated was protested by Awami League supporters who described him as an "outsider". Majumder's vehicle was vandalised by protestors when he was coming to Netrokona. Majumder worked as a server of Ganabhaban before being nominated as an MP.

References

Awami League politicians
Living people
11th Jatiya Sangsad members
1959 births